Atgharia is a village and a gram panchayat in Kalna I CD block in Kalna subdivision of Purba Bardhaman district in the Indian state of West Bengal.

Geography

Location

Urbanisation
87.00% of the population of Kalna subdivision live in the rural areas. Only 13.00% of the population live in the urban areas. The map alongside presents some of the notable locations in the subdivision. All places marked in the map are linked in the larger full screen map.

Demographics
As per the 2011 Census of India, Atgharia had a total population of 2,188 of which 1,107 (51%) were males and 1,081 (49%) were females. Population below 6 years was 128. The total number of literates in  Atgharia was 1,581 (79.21% of the population over 6 years).

Transport
Atgharia is on Kalna Road.

Healthcare
Atgharia Rural Hospital at Atgharia (with 30 beds) is the main medical facility in Kalna I CD block. There are primary health centres at Baghnapara (with 10 beds), Sahajpur (with 6 beds) and Sultanpur (with 10 beds).

See also - Healthcare in West Bengal

References

Villages in Purba Bardhaman district